The following is a list of armed conflicts between Armenia and Azerbaijan, including their predecessor states.

See also
 Anti-Armenian sentiment in Azerbaijan
 Anti-Azerbaijani sentiment in Armenia
 Armenia–Azerbaijan relations

References

 
Azerbaijan
Armenia
Armenia–Azerbaijan military relations
Armenia–Azerbaijan border
Nagorno-Karabakh conflict
conflicts
conflicts